Michael Kirwan (December 27, 1953 – May 26, 2018) was an American artist, known for his distinctively stylized erotic illustrations and comics, published in more than 600 magazines. Although he focused primarily on homoerotic themes, he also produced substantial work for the heterosexual and fetish markets. He worked primarily in Prismacolor markers and permanent ink.

Style 

Rather than a photorealist or idealist approach, he drew characters cartoonishly, to "universalize" the scenes for audience identification. He depicted diverse subjects – including inter-racial and inter-generational scenes, and people from different socio-economic backgrounds – who were not physical ideals, sometimes with disabilities or physical deformities. He wrote "My guys are stand-ins for everyone who's ever sucked a dick, incorporating the lust, confusion, contentment, guilt, passion, and bonding that I observe in the homo realm." His style has been likened to Paul Cadmus, Robert Crumb, and George Grosz, and contrasted with Tom of Finland.

While appearing somewhat primitive all his work was carefully planned.  Each drawing was preceded by a plethora of sketches.  He was careful with each background detail.  Each drawing contains layers of colors.  He loved studying patterns.  Tiles, bricks and fabric folds are carefully described with each pen mark.  He loved using a mirror to reflect the rest of the image that may have been lost.

Early life 
Kirwan was born on December 27, 1953, in New York City. His family was poor, so as a child he drew on paper grocery bags. He attended a middle school run by the Catholic Archdiocese of New York that allowed the most gifted students to take art classes.

Career 
Kirwan began producing homoerotic art in the early 1980s, inspired by his job as an attendant at St. Mark's Baths, a gay sex club. His first published work appeared in Playguy magazine. He produced monthly comic strips for Playguy, including The Roadies, which ran from October 1995 through September 1997; The Adventures of Richie Tease, from October 1997 through January 1999; and Beginner's Luck, which began in July 1999. As the market for magazine illustrations declined, Kirwan turned to commissioned work.

He spent a year as the first Artist in Residence with the Tom of Finland Foundation, which inducted him into its Erotic Artist Hall of Fame in 2004. In 2011, Bruno Gmünder published Just So Horny, a 128-page collection of his work.

Personal life 
He married his high-school girlfriend when she became pregnant, and they had a son, Larry. They remained married until she divorced him due to his sexual infidelity with men in the late 1970s.

Kirwan died in his sleep on May 26, 2018.

Other 
In 2019 the National Leather Association International established an award named after Kirwan for creators of erotic art in the style of Expressionism.

References 

1953 births
2018 deaths
American cartoonists
LGBT comics creators
American LGBT artists
Gay male pornographic comics
Gay male erotica artists
Artists from New York City